A political houseparty is a party held in a private home for the purpose of supporting a particular candidate, political party, or ballot measure, or to share information and opinions about an upcoming election.

Such events may be arranged as a dinner party, or with light or no refreshments in a more casual setting.  In municipal politics, it is not uncommon for the candidate to appear at the event to explain his or her platform and to answer questions.

Supporters are often encouraged to organize political house parties by the organizers of the political campaign.  Advantages include a stronger persuasive power than a lawn sign or political ad because some information is coming from trusted friends, there is time to convey a substantial amount of information, and the event is interactive.  The primary disadvantage is that the house party will only "reach" a relatively small number of people, compared to the time and money required to have it.

Parties
Election campaign terminology